Hornchurch and Upminster is a constituency represented in the House of Commons of the UK Parliament since 2017 by Julia Lopez of the Conservative Party.

Constituency profile and history 
The easternmost seat in Greater London, this seat was created by merging two of the three old constituencies comprising the London borough of Havering, specifically Hornchurch and Upminster. These two seats were lost by the Conservatives in Labour's landslide 1997 victory, but Upminster was one of the few Conservative gains in 2001 and Hornchurch was lost by Labour in 2005; this area is now very safe territory for the Conservatives since it gained their strongest areas from Hornchurch in the boundary changes. The 2015 result made the seat the 146th safest of the Conservative Party's 331 seats by percentage of majority. Also in the 2015 election, UKIP beat two of the 'big three' parties, Labour and the Liberal Democrats, and came second with 25% of the vote - one of their best results in the country that year.

The constituency includes affluent areas such as Hornchurch town centre, Cranham and Upminster. Limited pockets of deprivation exist in the north of the constituency and most output areas have high levels of retired constituents by Greater London standards, and the borough as a whole is similar to the London Borough of Bromley in that it has high levels of home ownership, on statistics compiled in the 2011 UK Census. The seat, like the London borough, is the only one in London that extends beyond the M25 motorway.

Boundaries

The seat was the proposal of the Boundary Commission's Fifth Periodic Review of Westminster constituencies in 2008–9 and was after consultation accepted by Parliament. Hornchurch and Upminster is essentially an expansion of the old Upminster seat to include a chunk of the old Hornchurch seat – specifically Hornchurch itself. Most of the western wards of Hornchurch went to the new Dagenham and Rainham seat.

The constituency of Hornchurch and Upminster is made up of eight electoral wards from the London Borough of Havering:

Cranham, Emerson Park, Gooshays, Hacton, Harold Wood, Heaton, St Andrew's, Upminster.

Members of Parliament

Election results

Elections in the 2010s

* Served as MP for Upminster in the 2005–2010 Parliament
The seat was contested for the first time in 2010, so percentage changes are based on notional results of the 2005 election.

Notes

References

External links 
Politics Resources (Election results from 1922 onwards)
Electoral Calculus (Election results from 1955 onwards)
Hornchurch and Upminster, UKPollingReport

Politics of the London Borough of Havering
Parliamentary constituencies in London
Hornchurch and Upminster
Hornchurch